The Gold Coast is an affluent area in Seattle's Eastside suburbs.  It includes Clyde Hill, Medina, Yarrow Point and Hunts Point. Each of these municipalities ranked in Business Week's 2010 list of most expensive small towns in America.  Sometimes Beaux Arts Village is also included with the Gold Coast.

History
Medina has been known as the Gold Coast since the 1890s. The first mansion was built at Yarrow Point in 1888, and by the 1920s the area had several mansions belonging to the wealthy.

Seattle's gold coast
Areas of Seattle's Madison Park, a swath of often extremely expensive homes with lake views, are also called "Gold Coast".

Notable residents

Several billionaires reside in Gold Coast cities, including:
Steve Ballmer (Hunts Point)
Jeff Bezos (Medina)
Bill Gates (Medina) (see also Bill Gates's house)

References

Geography of King County, Washington